Kiso District, Nagano held a mayoral election on November 27, 2005 after the merger of four towns into a new district. Independent Tanaka Katsumi won the election.

Candidates 

 Isoo Hideo, a former prefectural government official.
 Tanaka Katsumi, Independent candidate and former mayor of Kiso-Fukushima. Supported by the Japanese Communist Party

Results

References 
 Results from JanJan 
 Japan Press Coverage

Kiso, Nagano (town)
2005 elections in Japan
Mayoral elections in Japan
November 2005 events in Japan